Jack Marcus Evans (born 25 April 1998) is a Welsh professional footballer who plays as a midfielder most recently for Merthyr Town.

Club career
Evans joined Swansea City at the age of eight. In the summer of 2018, he was diagnosed with cancer. In February 2019, whilst in remission from the disease, Evans signed a new contract with Swansea. On 28 August 2019, he made his debut for Swansea, as a second-half substitute in a 6–0 EFL Cup home win against Cambridge United.

On 31 January 2020, Evans joined League Two side Mansfield Town on loan for the remainder of the 2019–20 season.

On 9 September 2020, Evans joined Cypriot First Division side Pafos on loan for the 2020–21 season.

On 8 January 2021, Evans joined League Two side Newport County on a permanent contract until the end of the 2020–21 season. He made his Newport debut as a first-half substitute in the 1–0 League Two defeat to Southend United on 9 February 2021.  He left the club at the end of the season, following the expiry of his contract.

In August 2021, Evans joined Cymru Premier side Penybont.

On 3 March 2022, Evans signed for Southern League Premier Division South side Merthyr Town.

International career
Evans first represented Wales under-19s in November 2016, playing against Greece and England. In June 2017, he played three times for Wales U20 at the 2017 Toulon Tournament. Evans has also represented Wales U21.

Personal life
Jack Evans is the older brother of professional footballer Cameron Evans.

References

1998 births
Living people
Footballers from Swansea
Association football midfielders
Welsh footballers
Swansea City A.F.C. players
Mansfield Town F.C. players
Newport County A.F.C. players
Wales youth international footballers
Wales under-21 international footballers
Pafos FC players
Penybont F.C. players
Merthyr Town F.C. players
English Football League players
Cymru Premier players
Cypriot First Division players
Southern Football League players
Welsh expatriate footballers
Expatriate footballers in Cyprus
Welsh expatriate sportspeople in Cyprus